NGC 2158 is an open cluster in the constellation of Gemini.  It is, in angle, immediately southwest of open cluster Messier 35, and is believed to be about 2 billion years old. The two clusters are unrelated, as the subject is around 9,000 light years further away.

Once thought to be a globular cluster, it is now known to be an intermediate-age, metal-poor open cluster that is a member of the old thin disk population.

References

External links
 
NGC 2158 (SEDS)
 

2158
Open clusters
Gemini (constellation)